Hunting Aerosurveys Ltd was a British aerial photography company founded by Percy Hunting in 1944.  Its operations became more diversified under the name Hunting Surveys.

History
The firm incorporated Aerofilms Ltd and the Aircraft Operating Company.  In 1947 it was using three types of aircraft: Austers, a Percival Proctor and a de Havilland Dragon Rapide and planned to acquire one or more Percival Mergansers.  The company had contracts for work surveying for tin mining in Nigeria; oil in Arabia, Venezuela and Colombia; timber in Ontario; and mapping in Australia & Hong Kong (in 1963).

Between 1957 and 1964, Hunting operated a specially converted Auster Autocar for smaller scale aerial survey work.

In 1960 the firm was merged with Hunting Geophysics Ltd to form Hunting Surveys Ltd.  Threatened with closure in the mid-1980s, it was merged with sister company Hunting Aerofilms Ltd to become simply Aerofilms Ltd in 1987. The new company was able to provide state-of-the-art serial survey work and associated mapping, with the oblique aerial photography that Aerofilms had been undertaking since 1919. In 1997 the company was sold to Simmons Mapping in Somerset, a move that ultimately led to the complete closure of the oblique photography business (and its long-established photo library) in 2006, with the vertical / survey side of the business passing to the Somerset operation.

Fleet
 Auster Autocar
 de Havilland Dove
 de Havilland Dragon Rapide
 Douglas C-47B
 Percival Merganser
 Percival Proctor

See also
 List of defunct airlines of the United Kingdom

References

Bibliography

Aerial photography
Surveying organizations